María de los Ángeles Peralta (born 30 November 1977) is an Argentine middle and long distance runner. She competed in the marathon at the 2012 Summer Olympics, placing 82nd with a time of 2:40:50. She did not finish her 2016 Olympic marathon.

Personal life
Peralta is married to Andres and has two daughters Maia and Ainhoa. She took up running in 1986 and mostly trained in middle distances. She ran her first marathon in 2011.

Personal bests
800 m: 2:16.77 –  Santa Fe, 29 April 2006
1500 m: 4:23.20–  Santa Fe, 16 April 2005
3000 m: 9:20.53 –  Buenos Aires, 8 February 2014
5000 m: 16:13.43 –  Buenos Aires, 25 January 2014
10,000 m: 33:57.44 –  Buenos Aires, 26 January 2014
Half marathon: 1:15:21 –  Cardiff, 26 March 2016
Marathon: 2:37:57 –  Rotterdam, 15 April 2012
3000 m steeplechase: 10:33.71–  Rosario, 1 June 2003

Achievements

References

External links

 
 
 
 
 
 Tilastopaja biography

1977 births
Living people
Argentine female long-distance runners
Argentine female marathon runners
Argentine female steeplechase runners
Olympic athletes of Argentina
Athletes (track and field) at the 2012 Summer Olympics
Athletes (track and field) at the 2016 Summer Olympics
Sportspeople from Mar del Plata
South American Games bronze medalists for Argentina
South American Games medalists in athletics
Competitors at the 2014 South American Games
21st-century Argentine women